Michael A. Anthony (born April 4, 1950) is an American politician. He is a former member of the South Carolina House of Representatives from the 42nd District, serving from 2003 to 2018. He is a member of the Democratic party.

References

Living people
1950 births
Democratic Party members of the South Carolina House of Representatives
21st-century American politicians